Agustín Ernesto Irusta (born 19 July 1942) is a former Argentine football goalkeeper who played most of his career for San Lorenzo de Almagro.

Irusta was born in Villa María, Cordoba.  He made his professional debut for San Lorenzo on 23 June 1963 against Atlanta. He went on to make 257 league appearances for the club, which is the club record for a goalkeeper, and the fifth-highest tally of appearances in any position. 

Irusta also played for the Argentina national team.

Irusta was one of five players to win four league titles with San Lorenzo between 1968 and 1974, the others being Sergio Villar, Carlos Veglio, Victorio Cocco and Roberto Telch.

In 1977 Irusta joined Unión de Santa Fe where he made a further 13 appearances before his retirement in 1978.

Titles

References

External links
 San Lorenzo profile

1942 births
Living people
Sportspeople from Córdoba Province, Argentina
Argentine footballers
Argentina international footballers
Association football goalkeepers
San Lorenzo de Almagro footballers
Unión de Santa Fe footballers
Argentine Primera División players